Let's Sing Again is a 1936 American film directed by Kurt Neumann.

Plot 
 An orphan (eight-year-old boy soprano Bobby Breen) gets a chance to sing opera in New York.

Cast 
Bobby Breen as Billy Gordon
Henry Armetta as Joe Pasquale
George Houston as Leon Alba
Vivienne Osborne as Rosa Donelli
Grant Withers as Jim 'Diablo' Wilkins
Inez Courtney as Marge Wilkins
Lucien Littlefield as Supt. Henry Perkins
Richard Carle as Carter
Clay Clement as Jackson
Ann Doran as Alice Alba

Soundtrack 
 "Let's Sing Again" (Music by Jimmy McHugh, lyrics by Gus Kahn)
 "Lullaby" (Music by Hugo Riesenfeld, lyrics by Selma Hautzik)
 "Farmer in the Dell" (Music by Samuel Pokrass, lyrics by Charles O. Locke)

External links 

1936 films
American black-and-white films
1936 musical films
Films directed by Kurt Neumann
Films produced by Sol Lesser
American musical films
1930s English-language films
1930s American films